Balls Creek Campground is a historic Methodist camp meeting and national historic district located near Bandy's Crossroads, Catawba County, North Carolina. The district encompasses 310 contributing buildings and 1 contributing site. They include the Arbor (c. 1930), "tents" (individual family dwellings) dating back to the 1850s, a store called "The Shack" (c. 1940), and jail dated to the late-19th / early-20th century.

History
The site was established in 1853 and is an offshoot of Rock Springs Campmeeting in Denver, NC after Lincoln was split into Catawba and Lincoln counties. and is believed to be one of the largest religious campgrounds in the southern United States.  A camp meeting continues to be held there every August, with "tents" selling for as much as $65,000 each. The site was added to the National Register of Historic Places in 1990.

On September 29, 2019, a "suspicious" fire destroyed or damaged 40 of the site's 302 cabins and elicited the response of more than 14 fire departments and over 100 firefighters from Catawba and surrounding counties.

See also

Pleasant Grove Camp Meeting Ground
Ocean Grove Camp Meeting Association
Chapel Hill Church Tabernacle
Rock Springs Campmeeting

References

External links
Balls Creek Campground Website
Rock Springs Campground Website

Campgrounds in North Carolina
Properties of religious function on the National Register of Historic Places in North Carolina
Historic districts on the National Register of Historic Places in North Carolina
1853 establishments in North Carolina
Buildings and structures in Catawba County, North Carolina
National Register of Historic Places in Catawba County, North Carolina
Temporary populated places on the National Register of Historic Places
Camp meeting grounds
Methodism in North Carolina